Army commissar 2nd rank was a political rank in the Soviet Red Army, equivalent to the military rank of Komandarm 2nd rank.

Appointment

1935
Appointment to Army commissar 2nd rank as to the disposal of the Central Executive Committee of the Soviet Union and the Council of People's Commissars (CPC) from November 20, 1935:
Mikhail Amelin (1896-1937), arrested June 1937 and later executed
Lazar Aronshtam (1896-1938), arrested May 1937 and later executed
Anton Bulin (1894-1938) arrested December 1937 and later executed
Hayk Ovsepyan (1891 - 1937) executed
Pyotr Smirnov (1897-1939) promoted to Army Commissar of 1st rank December 20, 1937, arrested June 1938

1937
Yan Karlovich Berzin (1889-1938) as to CPC disposal June 14, 1937; arrested May 1938 and later executed
Lev Mekhlis (1889-1953) as to CPC disposal December 20, 1937; promoted to Army Commissar of 1st rank in 1939

Military ranks of the Soviet Union